Knock Out is the fourth album by the German hard rock band Bonfire. It was released in 1991 on the label BMG International.

Track listing

Band members
Claus Lessmann - lead & backing vocals, acoustic guitar
Angel Schleifer - guitar, backing vocals
Joerg Deisinger - bass, backing vocals
Edgar Patrik - drums, percussion, backing vocals

References
 Billboard's Listing of Knock Out Album

Bonfire (band) albums
1991 albums